is a former Japanese football player.

Playing career
Ae was born in Hiroshima Prefecture on April 15, 1976. After graduating from Chuo University, he joined J1 League club Gamba Osaka in 1999. He also played for Avispa Fukuoka (April - September 2000) and Kashima Antlers (June - December 2001) on loan. However he could not play at all in the match at all clubs until 2002. In 2003, he moved to J2 League club Montedio Yamagata. Although he played 4 matches in 2004, he could hardly play in the match until 2005 and retired end of 2005 season.

Club statistics

References

External links

1976 births
Living people
Chuo University alumni
Association football people from Hiroshima Prefecture
Japanese footballers
J1 League players
J2 League players
Gamba Osaka players
Avispa Fukuoka players
Kashima Antlers players
Montedio Yamagata players
Association football goalkeepers